Shang may refer to:

Shang dynasty of ancient China
Yinxu, or the "Great City Shang"
Shanghai, sometimes abbreviated to Shang in compound names
Shangzhou District, Shaanxi, China, formerly Shang County
Shang, Leh, village in Jammu and Kashmir, India
Shang (bell), a Tibetan bell
Shang (surname), Chinese surname